Benjamin Chapin (August 9, 1872 – June 2, 1918) was an American stage actor best known as an impersonator of Abraham Lincoln. From childhood Chapin had an obsession with the assassinated president, and had a lengthy career playing him on the Lyceum circuit and in vaudeville. In 1906 he wrote a play Lincoln which was staged at the Liberty Theatre on Broadway following directly on from a production of the play The Clansman by Thomas Dixon Jr.

In 1917, Chapin wrote and starred in The Lincoln Cycle series of films. Despite the success of the project he was increasingly in ill health, and died in June 1918 from tuberculosis.

References

Bibliography 
 Bruce Babington & Charles Barr. The Call of the Heart: John M. Stahl and Hollywood Melodrama. Indiana University Press, 2018.

External links 
 

1872 births
1918 deaths
American male stage actors
American male film actors
Actors from Ohio
20th-century deaths from tuberculosis
Tuberculosis deaths in New York (state)
20th-century American male actors
20th-century American dramatists and playwrights